Leigh Markopoulos (19682017) was an American art critic, curator, and teacher. Markopoulos was the chair of the graduate program in curatorial practice at California College of the Arts. She had curated over 50 exhibitions, including ones at the Serpentine Gallery and the Hayward Gallery. Her focus was the art and artworld of the 1960s and 1970s.

Early life and education 
Leigh Markopoulos was born in Hannover, Germany, and grew up in Iraq, Australia and the UK. Markopoulos received a Bachelor of Arts degree from the University of Southampton, in Great Britain.

Career

Starting in 1991, Markopoulos worked as a curator in London, first at the Hayward gallery, and then at the Serpentine gallery. At the Serpentine she worked with artists that included Richard Artschwager, Hans Haacke and Bridget Riley. In 2002 she moved to San Francisco to become the deputy director at the CCA Wattis Institute for Contemporary Art. From 2005 to 2008 she was the director at the Rena Bransten gallery. In 2008 she began teaching full-time at CCA as chair of the curatorial practice program, in which she had been teaching part-time since 2003. In 2010 she started working with Creative Growth, a center for artists with developmental, mental and physical disabilities, where she curated Love is a Stranger (2010).

Publications

Books and exhibition catalogues

 
 Smith, Terry, Leigh Markopoulos and Kate Fowle, eds. Talking Contemporary Curating. New York: Independent Curators International, 2015.
 
 Markopoulos, Leigh and Julian Myers, eds. "HSz : as is/as if." San Francisco: California College of the Arts, 2010.
 Neshat, Shirin, and Leigh Markopoulos. Shirin Neshat. London: Serpentine Gallery, 2000.

References 

American art curators
American women curators
1968 births
2017 deaths
21st-century American women